Malin Ek (born 18 April 1945) is a Swedish stage and film actress.  She won the Eugene O'Neill Award in 2010.  She is the daughter of actor Anders Ek (the 1971 O'Neill Award laureate) and choreographer Birgit Cullberg.

She won the award for Best Actress at the 19th Guldbagge Awards for her role in Mamma. She won again in 1985 for her role in False as Water. She won it for a third time at the 26th Guldbagge Awards for her role in The Guardian Angel.

Selected filmography
 Mamma (1982)
 False as Water (1985)
 The Guardian Angel (1990)

References

External links

 Malin Ek, Dramaten

Swedish stage actresses
Swedish film actresses
People from Malmö
1945 births
Living people
European Film Awards winners (people)
Eugene O'Neill Award winners
Litteris et Artibus recipients
Best Actress Guldbagge Award winners
Ek family